Mosey Run is a  long 1st order tributary to Oil Creek in Crawford County, Pennsylvania.

Course
Mosey Run rises on the South Branch French Creek divide in Union Township, Pennsylvania.  Mosey Run then flows south-southeast through the Erie Drift Plain to Oil Creek at Lincolnville, Pennsylvania.

Watershed
Mosey Run drains  of area, receives about 46.2 in/year of precipitation, has a topographic wetness index of 463.09 and is about 54% forested.

References

Additional Images

Rivers of Pennsylvania
Rivers of Crawford County, Pennsylvania
Rivers of Erie County, Pennsylvania